The Railways women's football team is an Indian women's football team representing the Indian Railways in the Senior Women's National Football Championship. They have appeared in the Santosh Trophy finals four times, and have won the trophy once. They won their maiden championship title at the 2015–16 edition defeating the reigning champions Manipur in the penalty shootout.

Honours
 Senior Women's National Football Championship
 Winners (1): 2015–16
 Runners-up (3): 2016–17, 2019–20, 2021–22

References

Sport in Indian Railways
Railway association football clubs in India
Women's football teams in India